The 1995–96 Divizia B was the 57th season of the second tier of the Romanian football league system.

The format has been maintained to two series, each of them having 18 teams. At the end of the season, the winners of the series promoted to Divizia A and the last two places from both series relegated to Divizia C.

Team changes

To Divizia B
Promoted from Divizia C
 Petrolul Moinești
 Danubiana București
 Precizia Săcele
 CFR Cluj

Relegated from Divizia A
 Inter Sibiu
 Politehnica Iași

From Divizia B
Relegated to Divizia C
 FC Caracal
 Bihor Oradea
 Portul Constanța
 FC Râmnicu Vâlcea

Promoted to Divizia A
 Oțelul Târgoviște
 Jiul Petroșani

Renamed teams
Danubiana București merged with Astra Ploiești and was renamed as Danubiana Ploiești.

Unirea Alba Iulia was renamed as Apulum Alba Iulia

League tables

Seria I

Seria II

Top scorers 
24 goals
  Claudiu Niculescu (Electroputere Craiova)

15 goals
  Daniel Bona (Precizia Săcele)

13 goals
  Lucian Marinescu (CSM Reșița)

10 goals
  Pompiliu Stoica (Gloria Buzău)

9 goals
  Mihai Dăscălescu (Corvinul Hunedoara)

8 goals 
  Giani Gorga (FC Onești)
  Ovidiu Maier (Inter Sibiu)

7 goals
  Sorin Oncică (CFR Cluj)
  Robert Ilyes (Foresta Fălticeni)

6 goals
  Iulian Dăniță (Dunărea Galați)
  Virgil Marșavela (Metrom Brașov)
  Costel Lazăr (Astra Ploiești)
  Nicolae Constantin (Astra Ploiești)
  Ionuț Savu (Rocar București)

See also
1996–97 Divizia A

References

Liga II seasons
Rom
2